Society First is a Greek political party founded by independent MPs Paris Moutsinas (Magnesia) and  (Athens B) and the politicians Stefanos Katsaras (Karditsa Prefecture). The party was founded in Athens on 24 April 2013 along with a number of other politicians derived basically from the Democratic Left, and many non-party citizens. 

2013 establishments in Greece
Components of Syriza
Political parties established in 2013
Socialist parties in Greece